In international law, a depositary is a government or organization to which a multilateral treaty is entrusted. The principal functions of a depositary are codified in Article 77 of the Vienna Convention on the Law of Treaties.

Belgium
Belgium's Ministry of Foreign Affairs serves as the depositary for multilateral treaties such as the treaty establishing Eurocontrol.

Canada
Canada's Global Affairs Canada Treaty Law Division serves as the depositary for multilateral treaties such as the Arctic Search and Rescue Agreement.

France
France's Ministry of Foreign and European Affairs serves as the depositary for multilateral treaties such as the Geneva Protocol.

Italy
Italy's Ministry of Foreign Affairs serves as the depositary for multilateral treaties such as the Treaty of Rome, which established the European Economic Community (a predecessor to the European Union).

New Zealand
New Zealand's Ministry of Foreign Affairs and Trade serves as the depositary for multilateral treaties such as the Trans-Pacific Strategic Economic Partnership Agreement and Trans-Pacific Partnership.

Russia
Russia's Ministry of Foreign Affairs serves as the depositary for multilateral treaties such as the Biological Weapons Convention, Nuclear Non-Proliferation Treaty and Partial Nuclear Test Ban Treaty.

Switzerland
Switzerland's Federal Department of Foreign Affairs of Switzerland serves as the depositary for 78 multilateral treaties including the Geneva Conventions.

United Kingdom
The United Kingdom's Foreign, Commonwealth and Development Office currently acts as the depositary for documents such as Agreement on the Rescue of Astronauts, the Return of Astronauts and the Return of Objects Launched into Outer Space, Constitution of UNESCO, and the Convention on the Prohibition of the Development, Production and Stockpiling of Bacteriological (Biological) and Toxin Weapons and on their Destruction. Public copies are supplied by The Stationery Office and the British Library.

United States
The United States Department of State is currently the depositary for more than 200 multilateral treaties, including the Charter of the United Nations, Convention on International Civil Aviation, North Atlantic Treaty, Statute of the International Atomic Energy Agency, Treaty on Principles Governing the Activities of States in the Exploration and Use of Outer Space, including the Moon and Other Celestial Bodies, and the Treaty on the Non-proliferation of Nuclear Weapons. Generally, the United States executes its responsibilities in accordance with the will of each individual treaty or, in lieu of such provision, as per the Vienna Convention on the Law of Treaties.

United Nations Secretary-General
The United Nations Secretary-General serves as the depositary for numerous multilateral treaties, including the Chemical Weapons Convention, Comprehensive Nuclear-Test-Ban Treaty, Rome Statute of the International Criminal Court and United Nations Framework Convention on Climate Change.

References

External links
 SUMMARY OF PRACTICE OF THE SECRETARY-GENERAL AS DEPOSITARY OF MULTILATERAL TREATIES ST/LEG/7/Rev.l United Nations, 1994 

International law
Treaties
Multilateral relations
Treaties drafted by the International Law Commission